Miyar kuka or miyan kuka, also known as luru soup, is a type of soup popular among West Africa’s Sahelian ethnic groups. The soup is made from powdered baobab leaves. It is usually served with tuwo or fufu. A seasonal variant of this soup is made using fresh mashed baobab leaves. This variant is only available during the rainy season when fresh baobab leaves are available.

Preparation 
Water is added to the pot after boiling the beef. Cayenne pepper, dawadawa, crayfish, chopped onion and palm oil are added with the kuka (baobab leaf powder) sprinkled into the soup.

Miyar kuka is best served with tuwo shinkafa.

See also
 List of soups
 Hausa cuisine

References

External links
 Miyan Kuka Soup

Nigerian soups